

The American Aviation AA-2 Patriot was a four-seat, all-metal aircraft that was developed in 1970-71 by American Aviation of Cleveland, Ohio. The design did not progress beyond the prototype stage.

Development 
After the market success of the AA-1 Yankee Clipper American Aviation turned their attention to developing a four-seat aircraft. The American Aviation engineers started with a "clean sheet of paper" and designed a new aircraft. This aircraft was intended to be produced as the American Aviation AA-2 Patriot.

The resulting prototype bore very little family resemblance to the AA-1.  The AA-2 was different from the AA-1 in that it had doors instead of the Yankee's trademark sliding canopy and an oleo strut in place of the Yankee's spring steel tube nose gear. The aircraft had provisions for retractable gear to be installed on a later version, although the prototype had fixed landing gear. The AA-2 was powered by a 180 hp (134 kW) Lycoming engine.

The prototype, registered "N488AA", was completed in 1970 and test flying was commenced early in that same year. Aircraft performance during the test flying process fell far short of the design goals so the project was abandoned and the manufacturer eventually disassembled the prototype.

American Aviation made the decision to develop a stretched version of the AA-1 Yankee Clipper instead of pursuing the AA-2. This aircraft eventually was produced as the AA-5 Traveler and was later developed into the AA-5A Cheetah and the AA-5B Tiger.

Survivors
The prototype has been recovered by members of the American Yankee Association.

Specifications (AA-2 Patriot)

See also

References

External links
 Photos of the AA-2 prototype being recovered

1970s United States civil utility aircraft
Single-engined tractor aircraft
Patriot
Low-wing aircraft
Aircraft first flown in 1970